Krępiec is a river of Poland, a tributary of the Krypianka.

Rivers of Poland